A Master of Business (MBus) or Master of Business Studies (MBS) is an academic degree refers to a qualification in the degree of master that can be obtained by students of recognized universities and colleges who complete the relevant approved postgraduate programmes of study, pass the prescribed examinations, and fulfil all other prescribed conditions.

Generally, an MBus is similar to a Masters in Business Administration. These two degrees do not have significant difference.

Typical Framework 
The course will differ from institution to institution and can be in either taught or researched format but in general, it will encompass some or all of the following modules; Students who wish to focus in a particular area of study may choose a sequence of courses from within the specialisations:

 Accounting & Auditing
 Corporate Responsibility
 Electronic Business 
 Finance 
 Human Resource Management
 International Business 
 Information Systems 
 Management & Organisation Studies 
 Management Consultancy 
 Marketing 
 Project Management 
 Entrepreneurship and Innovation Management

The orientation of the programme very much depends on the chosen specialisation. Students can eventually choose to specialize in any of the above areas or in areas of particular relevance to them and their future careers. 
A typical course outline involves both structured coursework and independent research, with a strong emphasis on student initiative.

References

See also
 Bachelor of Business
 Bachelor of Commerce
 Master of Commerce
 Master of Business Administration
 Master of Management
 Master of Science in Management
 Doctor of Commerce
 Business school
 Business schools listed by country

Master's degrees

zh:商學碩士